The 2nd Indonesian Choice Awards (Official name: NET. 2.0 presents Indonesian Choice Awards 2015) was an entertainment industry award ceremony held on 24 May 2015, at the Indonesia Convention Exhibition in South Tangerang, Banten. The show was hosted by Sarah Sechan and David Bayu Danangjaya.

Awards were presented in 11 categories, including a new category, "Digital Persona of the Year". The awards ceremony aired live on NET. during their second birthday celebration, entitled NET 2.0.

Sheila on 7 was the biggest winner of the night, with three awards for "Band/Group/Duo of the Year", "Album of the Year" for Musim Yang Baik, and "Song of the Year" for "Lapang Dada". Other winners included Judika, who won "Male Singer of the Year", Maudy Ayunda, who won "Female Singer of the Year", Kunto Aji, who won "Breakthrough of the Year", etc.

The conductor, Addie MS, receiving the special award "Lifetime Achievement of the Year" for has been brought good name of Indonesia through music was brought by him.

Voting system
Voting for the 2014 Indonesian Choice Awards began on 1 May 2015. Members of the public could cast their votes via Twitter or Facebook.

Performances

Non-song performances

Presenters
 Sule and Andre Taulany – Presented Male Singer of the Year
 Dwi Sasono and Armand Maulana – Presented Song of the Year
 Dian Sastrowardoyo and Vincent Rompies – Presented Band/Group/Duo of the Year
 Deva Mahenra and Laudya Cynthia Bella – Presented Album of the Year
 Danang & Darto – Presented Digital Persona of the Year
 Boy William and Chelsea Islan – Presented Breakthrough Artist of the Year
 Tanta Ginting and Marissa Anita – Presented Female Singer of the Year
 Tara Basro and Tatjana Saphira – Presented Actor of the Year
 Desta and Shahnaz Soehartono – Presented Actress of the Year
 Ray Sahetapy and Pevita Pearce – Presented Movie of the Year
 Lukman Sardi and Gista Putri – Presented TV Program of the Year
 Ir. Rudiantara, MBA – Presented Lifetime Achievement of the Year

Winners and nominees
The full list of nominees and winners are as follows:

Music

Movie

Television

Other

Special award

References

2015 music awards
Indonesian Choice Awards